is a former Japanese football player who last played for J2 League team Yokohama FC.

Career
Komiyama is a left sided defender who has a sense of steady defence and accurate crosses. He was a member of the Japanese team what won gold in football in the 2005 Summer Universiade in Turkey. In 2006, he joined the Yokohama F. Marinos as part of  a special JFL/J.League program and made his debut for the club. In 2007, he signed full professional terms with Yokohama F. Marinos. Komiyama received a call-up for the national team in 2007 by Ivica Osim but he never played a game for Japan.

J-League firsts
 Appearance: 12 August 2006. Yokohama F. Marinos 1 vs 1 Kawasaki Frontale, Todoroki Athletics Stadium

Career statistics
Updated to 23 February 2018.

References

External links
Profile at Yokohama FC 
Profile at Kawasaki Frontale 

1984 births
Living people
Juntendo University alumni
Association football people from Chiba Prefecture
Japanese footballers
J1 League players
J2 League players
Yokohama F. Marinos players
Kawasaki Frontale players
Yokohama FC players
Association football defenders